The Bangalore Brigade was an infantry brigade of the British Indian Army formed in 1904 as a result of the Kitchener Reforms.  It was mobilized as 27th (Bangalore) Brigade at the outbreak of the First World War.  As part of Indian Expeditionary Force B, it was sent to assault Tanga in German East Africa.  With the failure of the Battle of Tanga, its units joined the defences of British East Africa and it was broken up.  

The brigade was reformed in India in 1917 for internal security duties and to aid the expansion of the Indian Army in the last year of the war.  It, too, was disbanded in 1926.

A 2nd Bangalore Brigade also existed from 1904 to 1911.

1st Bangalore Brigade
The Kitchener Reforms, carried out during Lord Kitchener's tenure as Commander-in-Chief, India (1902–09), completed the unification of the three former Presidency armies, the Punjab Frontier Force, the Hyderabad Contingent and other local forces into one Indian Army.  Kitchener identified the Indian Army's main task as the defence of the North-West Frontier against foreign aggression (particularly Russian expansion into Afghanistan) with internal security relegated to a secondary role.  The Army was organized into divisions and brigades that would act as field formations but also included internal security troops.

The 1st Bangalore Brigade was formed in December 1904 as a result of the Kitchener Reforms.  The brigade formed part of the 9th (Secunderabad) Division.  In 1906, the 2nd Bangalore Brigade was renamed as the Bangalore Cavalry Brigade, and the 1st Brigade became simply the Bangalore Brigade.

27th (Bangalore) Brigade
In August 1914, Indian Expeditionary Force B was intended to assault Dar es Salaam in German East Africa with 16th (Poona) Brigade as its nucleus.  In the event, 16th (Poona) Brigade was mobilized with 6th (Poona) Division and sent to Mesopotamia.  Instead, Bangalore Brigade was mobilized on 10 September 1914 as the 27th (Bangalore) Brigade along with the Imperial Service Infantry Brigade.

The Force sailed from Bombay on 16 October with Tanga as the target for an attack.  After the failure of the Battle of Tanga (2–5 November), the Force disembarked at Mombassa and joined the defences of British East Africa.  The brigade was broken up at this point.

Reformed brigade
The Bangalore Brigade was reformed in 9th (Secunderabad) Division in January 1917.  It remained with the division for the rest of the war, carrying out internal security duties.  In the final year of the war, the division (and brigade) took part in the general expansion of the Indian Army as new units were formed.  It was disbanded in 1926.

Orders of battle

1st / 27th Brigade commanders
The 1st Bangalore Brigade / Bangalore Brigade / 27th (Bangalore) Brigade / Bangalore Brigade had the following commanders:

2nd Bangalore Brigade

As a result of the Kitchener Reforms of the British Indian Army, the 2nd Bangalore Brigade was formed in December 1904 from the former Bangalore Second Class District.  Major-General John Nixon, commander of the Bangalore District, took command.  The brigade formed part of the 9th (Secunderabad) Division.

In 1906, the brigade was renamed as the Bangalore Cavalry Brigade (and the 1st Bangalore Brigade became simply the Bangalore Brigade).  It was broken up in 1911.

2nd Brigade commanders
The 2nd Bangalore Brigade / Bangalore Cavalry Brigade had the following commanders:

See also

Notes

References

Bibliography

External links
 
 
 

Brigades of India in World War I
Military units and formations established in 1904
Military units and formations disestablished in 1911
Military units and formations disestablished in 1914
Military units and formations established in 1917
Military units and formations disestablished in 1926